Alexander Jerome Scales (born July 3, 1978) is a former American professional basketball player.

Biography
Born in Racine, Wisconsin, Scales attended Racine Lutheran High School.

He played at the collegiate level at the University of Oregon.

Scales played in the Continental Basketball Association (CBA) for the Grand Rapids Hoops during the 2002–03 season and earned All-CBA Second Team honors.

Scales has most recently played with Mersin Büyükşehir Belediyesi S.K. and Oyak Renault of the Turkish Basketball League, as well as BC Kyiv of the Ukrainian Basketball SuperLeague and VTB United League. Previously, he was a member of the San Antonio Spurs of the National Basketball Association in 2005. That year, he was also a member of USA Basketball. In the only game Scales played in his NBA career, he substituted for Robert Horry in the final 9.2 seconds of a Spurs game on November 19, 2005. In that game, the Spurs defeated the Phoenix Suns 97–91, with Scales recording no stats.

He was waived by the Spurs nine days later on November 28 but was acquired by the NBA Development League team Austin Toros on December 21, 2005. At 9.2 seconds (0.153 minutes), Scales previously owned the record for fewest minutes played in an NBA career. This record was broken by JamesOn Curry when he played 3.9 seconds (0.065 minutes) in his only NBA game on January 25, 2010, at the end of the third quarter for the Los Angeles Clippers.

He has also been a member of the Seoul Samsung Thunders of the Korean Basketball League, CSK VVS Samara of the Russian Basketball Super League, Aris B.C. of HEBA A1, Real Madrid Baloncesto of the Liga ACB and Euroleague Basketball, and the Jiangsu Dragons and Shanghai Sharks of the Chinese Basketball Association. He was a FIBA EuroCup All-Star during his time with BC Kyiv.

Scales competes for Team 23 in The Basketball Tournament. He was a guard on the 2015 team who made it to the $1 million championship game, falling 67-65 to Overseas Elite.

Career statistics

College

|-
| style="text-align:left;"|1998–99
| style="text-align:left;"|Oregon
| 32 || 31 || 29.6 || .404 || .309 || .738 || 5.9 || 3.2 || .8 || .4 || 14.3
|-
| style="text-align:left;"|1999–2000
| style="text-align:left;"|Oregon
| 30 || 28 || 32.0 || .455 || .338 || .780 || 4.3 || 2.5 || 1.4 || .4 || 16.3
|- class="sortbottom"
| style="text-align:center;" colspan="2"|Career
| 62 || 59 || 30.8 || .429 || .323 || .758 || 5.1 || 2.8 || 1.1 || .6 || 15.3

NBA

Source

Regular season

|-
| style="text-align:left;"|
| style="text-align:left;"|San Antonio
| 1 || 0 || .2 || – || – || – || .0 || .0 || .0 || .0 || .0

References

External links
 NBA statistics at Basketball Reference
 

1978 births
Living people
American expatriate basketball people in Argentina
American expatriate basketball people in China
American expatriate basketball people in Greece
American expatriate basketball people in India
American expatriate basketball people in Italy
American expatriate basketball people in Lebanon
American expatriate basketball people in Russia
American expatriate basketball people in South Korea
American expatriate basketball people in Spain
American expatriate basketball people in Turkey
American expatriate basketball people in Ukraine
American men's basketball players
Aris B.C. players
Atléticos de San Germán players
Austin Toros players
Basket Livorno players
Basketball players from Wisconsin
BC Samara players
BC Kyiv players
Big3 players
Fortitudo Pallacanestro Bologna players
Grand Rapids Hoops players
Huntsville Flight players
Jiangsu Dragons players
Liga ACB players
Mersin Büyükşehir Belediyesi S.K. players
Oregon Ducks men's basketball players
Oyak Renault basketball players
Real Madrid Baloncesto players
Seoul Samsung Thunders players
San Antonio Spurs players
San Jacinto Central Ravens men's basketball players
Shanghai Sharks players
Shooting guards
Sportspeople from Racine, Wisconsin
Undrafted National Basketball Association players
United States men's national basketball team players
American men's 3x3 basketball players